The Indonesian National Police (lit. The State Police of the Republic of Indonesia, abbreviated as POLRI) is the national law enforcement and police force of the Republic of Indonesia. Founded on 1 July 1946, it was formerly a part of the country's military since 1962. The police were formally separated from the armed forces on 1 April 1999 in a process which was formally completed on 1 July 1999.

The organization is now independent and is under the direct auspices of the President of Indonesia. The Indonesian National Police is responsible for law enforcement and policing duties all over Indonesia. 

The Indonesian National Police also takes part in international United Nations missions, and, after special training, provided security for the UNAMID mission to protect internally-displaced people in Darfur.

In total, per 2020 the total personnel that the Indonesian National Police possesses is 440,000, and the number is increasing every year, it includes 34,000 Brimob personnel, with up-to 7,000 water and aviation police personnel. Polri is also assisted by an estimated 1 million members of Senkom Mitra Polri volunteers throughout the country which are civilians that assist the police.

The headquarters of the Indonesian National Police is located in Kebayoran Baru, South Jakarta and the Indonesian National Police hotline-emergency number is 110 which serves all over Indonesia 24 hours.

History

While Indonesia was under Dutch colonial rule, police duties were performed either by military establishments or the colonial police, known as the Veldpolitie or field police. Japanese occupation during World War II brought changes when the Japanese formed various armed organisations to support their war effort. This led to militarily-trained youths being armed with confiscated Dutch arms to perform police duties.

After the Japanese occupation, the national police became an armed organization. The Indonesian police was established on 19 August 1945 (under the title of the National Police Agency (Badan Kepolisian Negara)) and its units fought in the Indonesian National Revolution against the invading Dutch forces. The police also participated in suppressing the 1948 communist revolt in Madiun. In 1962, the police was brought under the control of the Commander of the National Armed Forces and the Ministry of Defence, becoming the Indonesian Police Forces (Angkatan Kepolisian).  Following the proclamation of independence, the police played a vital role when they actively supported the people's movement to dismantle the Japanese army, and to strengthen the defence of the newly created Republic of Indonesia. The police were one of the non-combatants who were required to surrender their weapons to the Allied forces. During the Indonesian National Revolution, the police gradually formed into what is now known as Kepolisian Negara Republik Indonesia (Polri) or the Indonesian National Police. In April 1999, the police force officially regained its independence and since then has been a separate force from the armed forces proper.

1 July, which became National Police Day (Hari Bhayangkara), honours the anniversary of the 1946 Cabinet resolution placing the INP as a national agency subordinated directly to the government of the Republic and thus responsible to the President (formerly the Prime Minister).

Duties and tasks

The key tasks of the Indonesian National Police are to:
 maintain security and public order;
 enforce the law, and
 provide protection, and service to the community.

In carrying out these basic tasks, police are to:
 perform control, guard, escort and patrol of the community and government activities as needed;
 supply all activities to ensure the safety and smoothness of vehicular traffic on every kind of roadway,
 develop community awareness in the development of national law;
 implement order and ensure public safety;
 implement co-ordination, supervision, and technical guidance to the investigators, civil servants/authorities, and the forms of private security;
 implement the investigation against all criminal acts in accordance with the criminal procedure law and other legislation;
 implement identification such as police medical operations, psychology, and police forensic laboratory for the interests of the tasks set by the service,
 protect soul safety, property, society, and the environment from disturbances and/or disaster, including providing aid and relief to uphold human rights;
 serve interests of citizens for a while before it is handled by the agency and/or authorities;
 give services to the public in accordance with the interests of the police task environment;
 implement other duties in accordance with the Constitution and legislative acts, which in practice are regulated by Government Regulation;
 receive reports and/or complaints;
 perform crowd and public control;
 help resolve community disputes that may interfere with the public order;
 supervise the flow that can lead to the dismemberment or threaten the unity of the nation;
 publicise police regulations within the scope of police administrative authority;
 implement special examination as part of the police identification;
 respond first and rapid action to a scene;
 take the identity, fingerprints and photograph of a person for identification purposes;
 look for information and evidence;
 organise National Crime Information Centre;
 issue licence and / or certificate that is required to service the community;
 give security assistance in the trial and execution of court decisions, the activities of other agencies, as well as community activities; and
 receive, secure, and keep lost items located and found for a while until further identification

Hierarchy
The organization of the Indonesian National Police is hierarchical, headed by the POLRI general headquarters in Kebayoran Baru. There is no differentiation between the central organization with its regional components. 
Regional Police Force (Polda) which covers an entire province and is headed by a two-star police general (Police Inspector). It was formerly known as Police Commissariats and Regional Police Commands (Komdak).
Resort/Departmental Police Force (Polres) which covers a city or regency  and is usually headed by a police officer holding the rank of Police Chief Commissioner for urban areas and a Police Deputy Chief Commissioner for rural areas. It was formerly known as Resort/Departmental Police Commands.
Sectoral Police Force (Polsek) which covers a district and is usually headed by a police officer holding the rank of Police Commissioner for urban areas and a Police Deputy Commissioner for rural areas. Meanwhile in Papua there are Polseks which are headed by officers with lesser ranks, such as Police Inspectors.  
Community Police Officers (abbreviated Bhabinkamtibmas) are senior NCOs/Sub-Inspectors of Police officers which are coordinated under the Sectoral Police office. They are tasked in mentoring, supervising, and maintaining law and order in a particular smaller community which usually covers an urban village and/or a rural village (desa). They are identified by their yellow brassard printed "BHABINKAMTIBMAS" and are tasked to monitor local community activities such as during elections and/or other community gathering occasions.

Until 2010, there was also a police force division called Territorial Police Force (Polwil) positioned between Polda and Polres. Polwils' divisions were based on Dutch East Indian residencies. The legacy of Polwils remain on the vehicle code on Indonesian vehicle registration plates.

Organization

Leadership elements 
The leadership elements headed not only the Police Force General Headquarters (abbreviated Mabes Polri) in Jakarta, but also the entire Indonesian National Police Force.

 Chief of the Indonesian National Police (abbreviated Kapolri). He is appointed by and answerable only to the President of Indonesia; and
 Deputy Chief of the Indonesian National Police (abbreviated Wakapolri), who assists the Chief in managing the administration of the Police, representing the Chief in official duties, as well as executing other orders by the Chief.

Leadership support elements 
Inspectorate
General Inspectorate of the National Police, tasked with assisting the Chief in the implementation of supervision as well as conducting general inspection and treasury within the National Police including non-structural organizational units under the control of chief of national police.
Assistants to the Chief of Police
Assistant to the Chief of Police for Operations, tasked with assisting the Chief of Police in the implementation of operational management functions within the police environment including external coordination and cooperation as well as community empowerment and other POLRI auxiliary elements.
Assistant to the Chief of Police for General Planning and Budget, tasked to assist the Chief of Police in the implementation of general planning and budgetary functions, including the development of organizational and management systems and research and development within the Indonesian national police.
Assistant to the Chief of Police for Human Resources, tasked with assisting the Chief of Police in the implementation of human resources management functions, including efforts to maintain and improve the welfare of personnel within the Indonesian national police.
Assistant to the Chief of Police for Facilities and Infrastructure, tasked with assisting the Chief of Police in the implementation of the function of facilities and infrastructure within the Police.
Assistant to the Chief of Police for Logistics tasked with assisting the Chief of Police in the implementation of Police logistical efforts.
Divisions
Profession and Security Division is the special staffing element in the field of professional accountability and internal security. This division acts as the internal affairs of the Police Force, in charge of enforcement of discipline and law and order of police personnel.

Legal Division serves as the legal office for the Chief of Police, tasked with the provision of legal research, legal support, legal advices, legal development, legal guidance, and human rights support within the Police Force. 
Public Affairs Division tasked with maintaining the public image and relations of the Police Force, as well as providing publicly-accessible Police data, information, and documentations. 
International Relations Division is an assistant element of international relations leadership that is under the Chief of Police. This section also oversees the Indonesian National Crime Bureau Interpol, to deal with transnational crimes.
Police Information Technology Division, is a supporting element in the field of informatics which includes information technology and electronic communications.
Advisory Staff

The Advisory Staff to the Chief of Police advises the Chief of Police regarding strategic matters. The advisory staff consists of:

Advisory Staff Coordinator, which coordinates the advisory staff's workflow;
Advisor to the Chief of Police for Socio-Cultural Affairs;
Advisor to the Chief of Police for Political Affairs;
Advisor to the Chief of Police for Economic Affairs; and
Advisor to the Chief of Police for Management Affairs.

Headquarters elements 

 Executive Personal Staff provides technical and administrative support and assistance to the Police Chief and Deputy Chief in executing their duties.
 General Secretariat provides general secretarial and administrative support within the Police Headquarters.
 Headquarters Service provides technical support and other services within the Police Headquarters, including Headquarters facility management and maintenance.

Central executive agencies 
Baintelkam, or the Intelligence and Security Agency is responsible for fostering and performing intelligence functions in the field of security for the purpose of performing the operational and management duties of the national police as well as to support the implementation of government duties in order to realize domestic security. 
Bareskrim, or the Criminal Investigation Agency is responsible for fostering and conducting criminal investigation and investigation functions, including the function of forensic laboratory identification, in the context of law enforcement.
Baharkam, or the Security Maintenance Agency is responsible for fostering and conducting security guidance functions that include the maintenance and efforts to improve the security and public order conditions in order to achieve domestic security. 
Korbrimob, Brimob, or the Mobile Brigade Corps is in charge of performing security counseling functions particularly with regard to the handling of high-intensity security disturbances, in the framework of enforcement of internal security.
Korlantas, or the Traffic Corps is responsible for fostering and organizing traffic functions that include community education, law enforcement, traffic assessment, registration and identification of drivers and motor vehicles, and conducting road patrols.
Densus 88, or the Detachment 88 Anti-Terror Special Unit is responsible for carrying out intelligence, prevention, investigation, enforcement and operational support functions in the investigation and investigation of terrorism.

Supporting elements 
Police Education and Training Institute or Lemdiklat for short, is in charge of planning, developing, and organizing the function of education and training in formation and development of and to the scope of the Indonesian National Police for ensuring education of recruits or personnel which are specializing in particular policing units which includes the maintaining of professionalism, managerial, academic, and vocational education. Lemdiklat is responsible for the operation of the following educational institutions:
National Police Staff College is the education implementing element and special staff educational institution related to the development of police management and administration within the officer corps. It consists of: (1) National Police Advanced Officers College, (2) National Police Junior Staff College, and (3) National Police Command and Staff College.
Police Academy is the element of officer rank formation of Police recruits.
Police Higher Education College is an education and staffing element concerned with higher education and the development of police science. 
Police Officers' Candidate School is the element of education for the formation of Police Officers to become officer rank originating from enlisted or constable ranks of policemen and policewomen. 
Police Baccalaureate Inspector School is the element of education for the establishment of Police officer from graduates with bachelor's degree, rather than via the Police Academy or Police Officer's Candidate School.
Police Education and Training Centers.
Police Medical and Health Center, including the Raden Said Soekanto National Police Central Hospital in Jakarta, tasked with Police Force health administration, Police physical and psychological fitness, and Police healthcare. 
Police Finance Center tasked with Police Force financial management and administration.
Police Research and Development Center tasked with Police Force research and development program management, research and development in public safety and order, research and development in public service, and other research and development functions.
Police Historical and Heritage Center, tasked with researching, documenting, recording, managing, educating, and collecting Police Force's historical memories, objects, and events. It also manages the Police Force Headquarters museum and library.

Regional Police

The Regional Police of the Republic of Indonesia (Polda) is the main implementing unit of territoriality under the Chief of Police. Polda is responsible for carrying out national police duties at province level. A "Polda" is headed by a Regional Chief of Police  (Kapolda), which is responsible to the Chief of national Police (Kapolri) and holds the rank of either Inspector General or Brigadier General. Kapolda is assisted by Deputy Chief of Police (Wakapolda).
The Regional Police (Polda) is responsible for the Departmental Police of the Republic of Indonesia (Polres) which covers a city or district/municipal level in that province. For big cities, Departamental Police (Polres) forces are called Metropolitan Police (Polrestabes), and for the urban type it is named only City Police (Polresta). The Polres has a complete police task force, like a Polda, and is led by a Police Chief Commissioner (Kombes) (for city police) or Police Superintendent (AKBP) for regency police.
Sectoral Police (Polsek) are led by a Police Superintendent (AKBP) or Police Commissioner (Kompol) (for urban divisions), while in other Poldas, Polseks are led by officers of Police chief inspector (AKP) rank for Rural areas. In some areas which are remote like Papua, a Polsek may be led by a Police Inspector 2nd Class (Ipda).

Each Regional Police headquarters (Polda) which covers a province oversees the following directorates:
Criminal Investigation Directorate
Sub-directorate of Criminal Affairs
Sub-Directorate for Crimes of Violence (Jatanras)
Sub-directorate for Teens, Children and Women affairs
Inafis Unit (Indonesia Automatic Finger Print Identification System) / Identification of TKP (Crime Scene)
Directorate of Special Crimes Investigation
Sub-Directorate of Corruption
Sub-directorate of Land and building Property (Hardabangtah)
Sub-directorate of Cyber Crimes 
Directorate of Drug Investigation
Narcotics Subdivision
Psychotropic subdivision 
Directorate of Intelligence and Security
Directorate of Traffic Security
Sub Directorate of Education and Conjecture (Dikyasa)
Sub Directorate of Registration and Identification (Regident)
Sub Directorate of Traffic Law Enforcement (Gakkum)
Sub Directorate of Road Security and Safety (Kamsel)
Sub Directorate of Road Escort and Patrol (Patwal)
Sub Directorate of Highway patrol (PJR)
Animal Unit (Unit Satwa) - (mounted police and K9 dogs)
Directorate of Community Guidance and Development (Bimmas, formerly Bina Mitra)
Patrol Units (Sabhara) Directorate - ("Alert Unit")
Directorate of VIP and Important Facility Protection (Pamobvit)
Directorate of Water police (Polair)
Directorate of Prisoners and Evidence Gathering (Tahti)
Operations Bureau
Human Resources Bureau
Bureau of Infrastructure Facilities (Sarpras, formerly Logistic)
Finance Office
Bureau of internal Profession and Security (Propam) - (Internal affairs unit)
Law Bureau
Public Relations and Press Service
Regional Police Medical Bureau

Units

Special units

Public units
The following fall under department police headquarters (Polres) of cities and regencies:

Rank structure
In the early years, the Indonesian Police used European style police ranks, like "Brigadier", "Inspector", and "Commissioner". When the police were amalgamated with the military structure during the 1960s, the armed forces' ranking system was brought in, using ranks such as "Captain", "Major", and "Colonel". In the year 2000, when the Indonesian Police transitioned into a fully independent force, they used British style ranks like "Constable" and "Superintendent", but returned to their original ranking system a year later, albeit with some Indonesianized elements to help bolster national pride.

The following ranks are only used by personnel serving in the Mobile Brigade Corps and Water police units:

Issues

Corruption
In the eyes of the people, the National Police force is "corrupt, brutal, and inept". Even becoming a police officer can be expensive, with applicants having to pay up to Rp90 million, according to Indonesia Police Watch head, Neta Saputra Pane.

In April 2009, angry that the Corruption Eradication Commission (KPK) had tapped his phone while investigating a corruption case, Indonesian Police chief detective Susno Duadji compared the KPK to a gecko fighting a crocodile meaning the police. Susno's comment, as it turned out, quickly backfired because the image of a cicak standing up to a buaya (similar to David and Goliath imagery) immediately had wide appeal in Indonesia. A noisy popular movement in support of the cicak quickly emerged.  Students staged pro-cicak demonstrations, many newspapers ran cartoons with cicaks lining up against an ugly buaya, and numerous TV talk shows took up the cicak versus buaya topic with enthusiasm. As a result, references to cicaks fighting a buaya have become a well-known part of the political imagery of Indonesia.

In June 2010, the Indonesian news magazine Tempo published a report on "fat bank accounts" held by senior police officers containing billions of rupiah. When the magazine went on sale in the evening groups of men said by witnesses to be police officers, went to newsstands with piles of cash to try to buy all the copies before they could be sold.

When KPK investigators tried to search Polri headquarters in 2010 as part of an investigation into Djoko Susilo, then the head of Korlantas (police corps of traffic), they were detained, and only released following the intervention of the president, Susilo Bambang Yudhoyono. Following a trial, Djoko was jailed for 18 years. Two years later, the KPK began investigating another senior police officer, Budi Gunawan, who was subsequently nominated for the post of National Police Chief. The KPK then named Budi a suspect and his nomination was withdrawn. However, he was later sworn in as deputy police chief. The police subsequently took revenge by charging three KPK commissioners with criminal offenses.

Violence and human rights abuses
Amnesty International has accused Polri of "widespread" torture and other abuses of arrested individuals.  According to the organization, "Police in Indonesia shoot, beat and even kill people without fear of prosecution, leaving their victims with little hope of justice".

In 2014 the Human Rights Watch reported that a physical virginity test is routinely performed on female applicants to the police force.

An official admission of violence by police officers came in 2016 when Chief Gen. Badrodin Haiti admitted that officers of the Detachment 88 anti-terror unit were responsible for the death in custody of terrorist suspect Siyono, who died of heart failure after being kicked hard enough in the chest to fracture his ribs. The Indonesian National Commission on Human Rights stated in March 2016 that at least 121 terror suspects had died in custody since 2007

Amnesty International called in June 2019 for an investigation of "credible evidence" of a range of grave violations by police, who it alleged were responsible for 10 unlawful killings in the aftermath of the re-election of president Joko Widodo.

In July 2020, the Indonesian Commission for Missing Persons and Victims of Violence (KontraS) issued a report detailing police brutality over the preceding year that resulted in 304 deaths and 1,627 injuries in 921 violent incidents. The report also mentioned arbitrary arrests of people demonstrating legally, and acts of discrimination towards ethnic Papuans. The following year, the same organization reported 651 acts of violence against civilians resulting in 13 deaths and 98 injuries. Most of the deaths were caused by excessive violence and arbitrary shootings.

In the summer of 2022, an investigation into the murder of Nofriansyah Yosua Hutabarat, an Indonesian police officer, overcame an alleged cover-up by police generals to conceal an alleged premeditated murder committed by Inspector General Ferdy Sambo, head of internal affairs of the Indonesian National Police, and four others, including Sambo's wife. The chair of Indonesia Police Watch called the affair "the worst scandal in the police's history". Ferdy Sambo was later sentenced to death, with Amnesty Indonesia stating "the case should serve as a reminder to the police that it needed to make serious improvements in its internal operations and that this was not the first time that a police officer had been involved in an extrajudicial killing”.

On the 1st of October 2022, Indonesian riot police deployed tear gas inside Kanjuruhan Stadium in response to a pitch invasion and clashes with football supporters, which triggered a stampede of people in the stadium trying to escape from the effects of the gas. A crush formed at an exit, resulting in fans being asphyxiated. As a result, 134 people died, and more than 500 were injured.  The National Commission on Human Rights in Indonesia (KOMNAS HAM) investigated the use of tear gas by police, and found that the Indonesian National Police were one of 6 parties responsible for the tragedy due to excessive use of tear gas inside the stadium. Other visual investigations, such as one by Narasi, also highlighted the force's abusive and excessive use of tear gas. Out of the 3 commanding officers that were charged for giving the order for tear gas to be fired, only 1 was given an 18 month sentence, whilst the other officers were acquitted, in a verdict deemed "an offense to the public's sense of justice".

Equipment

Firearms

The standard issue sidearm to all Indonesian National Police officers is the Taurus Model 82 revolver in .38 Special. While police personnel attached to special units such as Detachment 88, Gegana and BRIMOB are issued with the Glock 17 semi-automatic pistol.

Heavy arms are always available to Indonesian police personnel, such as the Heckler & Koch MP5 sub-machine gun, Remington 870 shotgun, Steyr AUG assault rifle, AK-101, M4 carbine, SIG MCX, SIG MPX, M1 Carbine. and other weapons. The standard rifle for the Indonesian National Police are the Pindad SS1 and the M16 rifle. Units are also issued the "Sabhara"/Police V1-V2 Pindad SS1 special law enforcement assault rifle.

Police vehicles
The police vehicles that are usually operated by the Indonesian Police ("Polri") for patrol and law enforcement activities are mainly, Mitsubishi Lancer, Hyundai Elantra (for some police regions), Mitsubishi Strada/Triton, Isuzu D-Max, Nissan Almera, Ford Ranger and Nissan Navara. Such vehicles are usually operated by the "Sabhara" police unit and other units which the vehicles are mainly colored dark-grey. In some areas, usually in rural places, the vehicles are not up-to date compared to the ones in the major urban areas in the country, so some police vehicles still use older versions such as the Toyota Kijang and Mitsubishi Kuda.

Special Investigation units usually operate in black Toyota Avanzas and some are unmarked vehicles. Police laboratory and forensics ("Puslabfor") units are issued dark-grey police Suzuki APV, Isuzu D-Max, Ford Ranger, Toyota Fortuner or Mitsubishi Fuso Canter vehicles.

The Traffic Police Corps ("Korlantas") usually uses vehicles such as the Mazda 6, Mitsubishi Lancer , Mitsubishi Galant v6, Toyota Vios, Toyota Corolla, Hyundai Ionic, Mitsubishi Pajero, Toyota Fortuner (usually for escort), Hyundai Elantra, Tesla Model 3 (mostly in Jakarta), Ford Ranger, Hino Dutro, Isuzu Mux, and Toyota Hilux (coloured white and blue). Some vehicles for traffic patrol are also used such as the Toyota Rush and Daihatsu Terios and suzuki grand vittara. Sedan types are usually used for highway and road patrolling and escort. Double-Cab types are usually used for Traffic incidents and traffic management law enforcement activities.

Police vehicles coloured orange usually Ford Focus and Mitsubishi Lancer sedans and white-orange Chevrolet Captivas are operated by the Vital Object Protection unit ("Pam Obvit") and usually parked outside and operated for international embassies, airports, and other special specified locations. It is also used by the Tourist police for patrol.

For the special police, counter-terrorism and anti-riot units such as the Mobile Brigade or "Brimob", Detachment 88 and "Gegana" units usually use special costumed vehicles for special operations such as the Pindad Komodo, Barracuda APC, and modified armored Mitsubishi Stradas, 2002 Nissan Terrano Spirits' and other special double-cabin and SUV vehicle types. Vehicles are coloured dark-grey with the bumper coloured orange identifying vehicles of the special police units. Some special operational "Gegana" and "Densus 88" vehicles are coloured black also with orange bumpers.

Other customised vehicles used for mobilisation of police personnel are usually modified Suzuki Mega Carrys, Isuzu Elfs and Toyota Dynas with horizontal side sitting facilities inside of the trunk covered by dark colored canvas for canopy. Costumed patrol pick-ups with mounted sitting facilities on the trunk covered with canopy are also operated by the police to carry police personnel during patrol, the pick-ups are usually Isuzu Panther pick-ups and usually operate in rural areas.

For high-ranking officers (usually generals), issued cars are usually grey (some black) full to compact sedans and Mid to Full-sized SUVs. Such cars are mainly chauffeured Toyota Camry, Hyundai Sonata, Toyota Land Cruiser, Suzuki Grand Vitara and Toyota Prado. Some use black Toyota Innova.

Ford Focus mostly not used anymore for Korlantas and Sabhara only small uses, while MPVs like Honda Mobilio and Toyota Innova sometimes used for Korlantas unit for patrol and escort.

Uniform

The National Police Force of Indonesia had changes for uniform colours about 3 times, the periods are:

 Since first formed until mid 70s, the uniform colour was khaki like the current Indian Police uniform.
 Since the late 70s until mid 90s, the uniform colour was light brown and brown.
 Since mid 90s until now the colour are brownish grey and dark brown.

Based on the regulation of the Chief of the Indonesian National Police, there are four types of uniform worn by police personnel which are:

 ceremonial uniform (PDU: PDU-I, PDU-II, PDU-III, PDU-IV)
 parade uniform (PDP: PDU Danup, PDU Danpas)
 service uniform (PDH: with uniform, and without uniform)
 field uniform (PDL: PDL-I, PDL-II which are PDL-II Two Tone, PDL-II Brimob Camo, PDL-II Black, PDL-II Reconnaissance, PDL-II Cavalry, PDL-II Highway Patrol, PDL-II Marine Police)

Ceremonial and service uniform are equipped with gorget paches (officially called "Monogram"). Higher officers (Brigadier General above) wear red while the rest wear dark brown.

Field and service uniform are equipped with office badge on left sleeve, and corps badge on the right sleeve. Officer with command held wears his/her office badge (Lencana Tanda Jabatan) on the right pocket and usually carries baton (called tongkat komando) while others don't.

Headgears and beret colors:
Red - Criminal Investigation Units ("Reserse", from Dutch word recherche) - don't wear berets during investigative work. They sometimes wear white dress shirt with red tie.
Dark Blue beret - Mobile Brigade Corps (Brimob) 
Blackish Dark Brown beret - "Sabhara"
Light Blue beret - Internal Affairs Division (Police Provosts) 
Peaked cap with White piping - Traffic Policemen

National Police Pledge (Tribrata) 
The National Police Pledge is a pledge of loyalty and fidelity of all sworn personnel and constables to the government and people of Indonesia, the principles of nationhood and the Constitution.

Personnel

List of Chiefs of Police (Kapolri)

In popular culture

Film
Menumpas Teroris, 1986 - starring Barry Prima and El Manik
Arie Hanggara, 1985 - A true story of the death of an 8-year-old boy by his stepmother starring Deddy Mizwar
The Police, 2009 - starring Vino G. Bastian
The Raid, 2011 - starring Iko Uwais, Joe Taslim and Donny Alamsyah
Java Heat, 2013 - starring Kellan Lutz, Ario Bayu and Mickey Rourke
22 Minutes, 2018 - starring Ario Bayu
Sayap Sayap Patah, 2022 - Based from 2018 Mako Brimob standoff starring Nicholas Saputra and Ariel Tatum

Television
 86 - 2014–present (based on show Cops), shown on NET TV every Monday to Friday at 6 am Western Indonesian Time
 The Police, every day at 11 pm Western Indonesian Time on Trans 7
Cleansing Kalijodo, 2016. Starring Ario Bayu (as then-Chief of Penjaringan Sectoral Police Police Captain Krishna Murti) and Fauzi Baadila (as Daeng Aziz) on Crime + Investigation

See also
 Indonesian Military (TNI)
 Criminal Investigation Agency (Bareskrim)
 Mobile Brigade Corps
 Detachment 88 (Densus 88) AT
 Gegana
 Municipal Police (Indonesia)
 Military Police Corps (Indonesia)
 Army Military Police Corps (Indonesia)

References

Further reading
 Amnesty International. (2009) "Indonesia: Unfinished Business: Police Accountability in Indonesia" (24 June 2009)
 International Crisis Group. (2001) Indonesia : National Police reform. Jakarta / Brussels : International Crisis Group. ICG Asia report; no.13
 David Jansen. (2008) "Relations among security and law enforcement institutions in Indonesia", Contemporary Southeast Asia, Vol.30, No.3, 429-54
 "Networked Security in Indonesia: The Case of the Police in Yogyakarta." Doctoral Dissertation, Australian National University (April 2010).

External links

 
 Community of Indonesian National Police
 Outside Indonesia view

Law enforcement agencies of Indonesia
Law enforcement in Indonesia
National Central Bureaus of Interpol
National police forces